Johnny Monell (born March 4, 1986) is an American former professional baseball catcher. He has played in Major League Baseball (MLB) for the Mets and San Francisco Giants, and in the KBO League for the KT Wiz in 2017.

High school career
Born and raised in the Pelham Park section of the Bronx, New York, Monell attended Christopher Columbus High School. Monell's father, Johnny Sr., spent 17 years in professional baseball but never made it to the major league level. Monell was originally drafted out of high school by the San Francisco Giants but decided to attend Seminole Community College. Monell was then drafted by the New York Mets in the 49th round in 2006, but turned it down. In 2007, Monell was drafted again by the Giants, this time in the 30th round, and he finally signed.

Professional career

San Francisco Giants
Monell was originally drafted by the San Francisco Giants in the 27th round of the 2005 MLB Draft out of Christopher Columbus High School in Bronx, New York. He did not sign, and instead played at Seminole Community College. The New York Mets then drafted him in the 49th round of the 2006 MLB Draft but he returned to college. Finally he was drafted by the Giants in the 30th round of the 2007 MLB Draft and signed.

Monell was called up to the majors for the first time on September 2, 2013 by the Giants. He flew out to left center field in his debut as a pinch hitter against the Arizona Diamondbacks on September 5. His first Major League hit was a single off of Peter Moylan of the Los Angeles Dodgers on September 14. That was his only hit in 8 at-bats for the Giants that September. He was designated for assignment on November 27.

Baltimore Orioles / Los Angeles Dodgers
Monell was sold to the Baltimore Orioles on November 30, 2013, who then designated him for assignment again on March 24, 2014. He was outrighted to the AAA Norfolk Tides, where he hit .209 in 30 games.

On May 28, 2014, Monell was traded to the Los Angeles Dodgers for cash, and assigned to the Triple-A Albuquerque Isotopes. In 38 games for the Isotopes, he hit .261.

New York Mets
Monell signed a minor league deal with the New York Mets on November 6, 2014. He was called up to the Mets on May 5, 2015. Monell finished the 2015 season appearing in 27 games with .167 batting average in 48 at-bats in 52 plate appearances while compiling 8 hits, 4 walks, 4 RBIs, and 5 runs scored. On December 18, 2015, Monell was designated for assignment to make room for Bartolo Colón. On December 23, 2015, Monell was outrighted to the Las Vegas 51s.

KT Wiz
On May 18, 2017, Monell was released by the KT Wiz.

Tampa Bay Rays
On January 26, 2018, he signed a minor league contract with the Tampa Bay Rays. He was released on March 28, 2018.

Second stint with the Mets
On April 13, 2018, it was announced that Monell had signed a minor league contract with the Mets organization following injuries to two Mets catchers. Monell retired on August 4th, 2018, for unspecified reasons.

References

External links

1986 births
Living people
Sportspeople from the Bronx
Baseball players from New York City
Major League Baseball catchers
San Francisco Giants players
New York Mets players
Seminole State Raiders baseball players
Arizona League Giants players
Salem-Keizer Volcanoes players
Augusta GreenJackets players
San Jose Giants players
Fresno Grizzlies players
Richmond Flying Squirrels players
Norfolk Tides players
Albuquerque Isotopes players
Gigantes de Carolina players
Criollos de Caguas players
Las Vegas 51s players
KT Wiz players
Liga de Béisbol Profesional Roberto Clemente catchers
Liga de Béisbol Profesional Roberto Clemente infielders